Clara Arnheim (24 April 1865 –  28 August 1942) was a German painter of Jewish ancestry; best known for her depictions of life among the fishermen on the Baltic coast. Her younger brother, Fritz Arnheim, was a noted historian.

Biography 
She was born in Berlin. Despite her family's resistance to the idea of a woman being a professional painter, she studied with Franz Skarbina in Berlin and Edmond Aman-Jean in Paris. Among the many organizations of which she was a member, the "Verein der Berliner Künstlerinnen" (an artists' society for women) and the Deutscher Künstlerbund are especially notable.

In 1914, on the occasion of the 150th anniversary of the Hochschule für Grafik und Buchkunst Leipzig, she displayed two graphic works at the "Internationalen Ausstellung für Buchgewerbe und Grafik" (BUGRA) and was awarded a gold medal.

At the beginning of the 1920s, she helped Henni Lehmann create the Blaue Scheune, an exhibition venue in Hiddensee, where she later took up residence. An organization known as the "" was established, which numbered Elisabeth Andrae, Käthe Loewenthal,  and Elisabeth Büchsel among its members.

Following the Nazi seizure of power, she was served with a Berufsverbot and was unable to exhibit or accept commissions. Over the years, the harassment worsened until she found it almost impossible to obtain ration stamps. Luckily, her friends in Hiddensee were able to  supply her with food in secret. The establishment of a ban against travel by Jews came while she was on a visit. Unable to return home, her resources dwindled and, in July 1942, she was transported to Theresienstadt, where she was put to death a few weeks later.

References

Further reading 
 Ruth Negendanck: Hiddensee. Die besondere Insel für Künstler, Atelier im Bauernhaus, Fischerhude 2005, .
 Ilka Wonschik: "Es war wohl ein anderer Stern, auf dem wir lebten …" : Künstlerinnen in Theresienstadt. Berlin : Hentrich & Hentrich, 2014

External links 

 
 
Clara Arnheim @ Der Hiddensoer Künstlerinnenbund

1865 births
1942 deaths
19th-century German painters
20th-century German painters
20th-century German women artists
19th-century German women artists
Jewish artists
Jewish women artists
Artists from Berlin
German people who died in the Theresienstadt Ghetto
German people executed in Nazi concentration camps